The Deanery of Christianity is a deanery in the Archdeaconry of Exeter, Diocese of Exeter.  The deanery covers most of the city of Exeter.  It takes the name "Christianity" because there is a tradition that a diocese and a deanery should not share the same name.

Benefice of Alphington (St Michael and All Angels)

Parishes within the mission community:
St Michael and All Angels, Alphington
St George, Shillingford St George 
St Ida, Ide

Clergy:
 Mike Partridge - rector and priest in charge

Benefice of Cathedral (St Peter)

Clergy:
 Jonathan Draper - Dean of Exeter
 Carl Turner - canon precentor
 Andrew Godsall - canon chancellor
 Paul Avis - canon theologian
 Ian Morter - canon treasurer

Benefice of Central Exeter (St Stephen, St Mary Arches, St Olave, St Pancras, St Petrock)

Parishes within the benefice:
St Stephen with St Mary Arches
St Olave with St Pancras and St Petrock

Clergy:
 Jonathan Draper - priest in charge-designate
 Ann Hall - assistant curate (NSM)
 Sheila Swarbrick - assistant curate (NSM)

Benefice of Countess Wear (St Luke)

Clergy:
 Richard Jeffery   Priest in charge of Countess Wear

Benefice of Exeter St David (St David with St Michael and All Angels)

Clergy:

Benefice of Exeter St James (St James)

Clergy:
 Henry Pryse Rector of St James′

Benefice of Exeter St Leonard with Holy Trinity (St Leonard and Holy Trinity)

Clergy:
 Simon Austin Rector of St Leonard's
 Chris Keane Associate Minister

Other staff:
Rachel Holyome Youth Minister
Sophie Gower Associate Women's Minister
Helen Morrissey Ministry Assistant
Tom Richards Ministry Assistant
Jonnie Armstrong Ministry Assistant
Joanna Raven Ministry Assistant

Benefice of Exeter St Mark 
Clergy:

 Rev Tanya Hockley-Still

Benefice of St Matthew with St Sidwell, Exeter 
Clergy:

 Rev Ed Hodges (from 22 July 2019)
Rev Matt Clayton Assistant Curate (Associate Vicar)
Rev Vanessa Pestridge. Assistant Curate

Benefice of Heavitree and St Mary Steps

Parishes within the benefice:
Heavitree (St Michael and All Angels) with St Lawrence, St Clare and St Paul.
St Mary Steps (St Mary)
Trinity Conventional District

Clergy:
 Ben Rabjohns Rector
 Jolyon Seward Team Vicar (Heavitree and St Lawrence)
Andrew Johnson
 David Apps (Semi-Retired)
 John Fairweather (Semi-Retired)

Benefice of Exeter St Thomas and Emmanuel

Parishes within the benefice:
Exeter St Thomas (St Thomas the Apostle) with St Andrew
Exeter Emmanuel (Emmanuel) with St Philip

Clergy:
Nicholas Edwards, Team Rector
Anne Dowdeswell, Team Vicar
Georgina Vye, Curate

Benefice of Exwick (St Andrew)

Clergy:
Jerry Bird, Priest in charge

Benefice of Whipton (St Boniface with Holy Trinity)
Clergy:
 John Byatt Priest-in-Charge

Exeter Network Church: A Bishop’s Mission Order

Leaders:

Jon Soper
Jo Soper

External links
Diocese of Exeter
Deanery of Christianity website
Exeter Network Church

Diocese of Exeter
Christianity in Devon
Deaneries of the Church of England